Mani is a Local Government Area in Katsina State, Nigeria. Its headquarters are in the town of Mani. Mani town was established more than 600 years ago while the Local Government was created in 1976 after the enactment of Local Government reforms act. Three other Local Governments (Mashi, Bindawa and Dutsi) were however carved from the Old Mani Local Government Area.

Traditionally, Mani is indisputably believed to be the root of the Sullubawa ruling dynasty of Katsina Emirate because the founder of the dynasty, Muhammadu Dikko, was the District Head of Mani during the reign of Sarkin Katsina Abubakar. From then onward, the traditional ruler of the District was known and called Durbin Katsina and one of the king makers of the emirate. Recently, the traditional title of the Head of the District was briefly changed to Sarkin Gabas Katsina and later reverted to the original title of Durbin Katsina.

Mani has an area of 784 km and a population of 176,966 at the 2006 census. Majority  of its inhabitants are farmers and are Fulani ethnicity. The town is arguable the most peaceful in whole of Nigeria.

 Abubakar Abdulkarim Tsagem was born in tsagem under Mani local government 
The postal code of the area is 823.

References

The current District Head is Alh. Umar Babani Isah Mani

Local Government Areas in Katsina State